The original Buffalo Bisons baseball club played in the National League between 1879 and 1885. The Bisons played their games at Riverside Park (1879–1883) and Olympic Park (1884–1885) in Buffalo, New York. The NL Bisons are included in the history of the minor-league team of the same name that still plays today; it is thus the only NL team from the 19th century that both still exists and no longer plays in Major League Baseball.

Year-by-year records

Players of note
Dan Brouthers
Bill Crowley
Davy Force
Pud Galvin 
Charley Radbourn
Jim O'Rourke
Hardy Richardson
Jack Rowe
Deacon White

Brouthers, Galvin, O'Rourke, Radbourn, and White are members of the Baseball Hall of Fame.

Highlights and memorable moments
1877: A precursor to the Bisons played in the League Alliance, finishing with a 79–28–3 record. The team subsequently joined the National League. 
1880: Future Hall of Fame pitcher Charlie Radbourn debuted as a second baseman on May 5 
1880: Pud Galvin pitched a no-hitter against the Worcester Ruby Legs on Aug. 20
1881: 2B Davy Force recorded 12 putouts, seven assists, two unassisted double plays, participated in a triple play, and made just one error in 20 chances in a 12-inning game against Worcester, on September 15.
1882: Ireland-born Curry Foley became the first major league player ever to hit for the cycle (including a grand slam), on May 25, and Dan Brouthers led the National League with a .368 batting average
1883: Brouthers won his second consecutive NL batting title with a .374 average and Galvin posted 46 wins
1884: Brouthers hit triples in four consecutive games, set a season team-record with 14 home runs, and Galvin won 46 games for the second year in a row. Galvin threw another no-hitter, on August 4. The Bisons' 18–0 score remains the greatest margin of victory in a no-hitter in Major League history. Two years after Foley, Jim O'Rourke became the fourth player in MLB history to hit for the cycle, on June 16.
1885: Brouthers hit .359, ending second in the NL batting race behind Roger Connor (.371)

National Baseball Hall of Fame members

See also

Buffalo Bisons all-time roster
1879 Buffalo Bisons season
1880 Buffalo Bisons season
1881 Buffalo Bisons season
1882 Buffalo Bisons season
1883 Buffalo Bisons season
1884 Buffalo Bisons season
1885 Buffalo Bisons season
Buffalo Bisons (disambiguation)
19th century National League teams

References

External links
Baseball Almanac
Team index page at Baseball Reference
Buffalo Bisons history

 
Defunct Major League Baseball teams
Defunct baseball teams in New York (state)
Baseball teams disestablished in 1885
Baseball teams established in 1879